Witham's Cemetery is a cemetery in Gibraltar.

Description

The cemetery takes its name from Captain Witham, a British officer of the 18th century involved in the sieges of Gibraltar,  said to be "a rather spirited gentleman, who enjoyed himself by digging up a garden over the night." The Gibraltar Naval Memorial notes that the U.S. Navy, in cooperation with the British, once moved graves from the Witham's Road Cemetery to the North Front Cemetery.

References

External links
 

Cemeteries in Gibraltar